Finlandssvensk samling (Finland-Swedish Association) is a non-government affiliated organisation in Finland that strives to protect the linguistic, cultural and human rights of the Finland Swedes.  It was founded in 2001 by Gösta von Wendt. The membership of the organization has drastically increased during the last few years.

It should not be confused with Swedish Assembly of Finland.

See also 
 Swedish Assembly of Finland
 Swedish People's Party

External links
 Finlandssvensk samling rf

Swedish-speaking population of Finland
Finland Swedish
Civic and political organisations of Finland